Mentha aquatica (water mint; syn. Mentha hirsuta Huds.) is a perennial flowering plant in the mint family Lamiaceae.  It grows in moist places and is native to much of Europe, northwest Africa and southwest Asia.

Description
The stems are square in cross section, green or purple, and variably hairy to almost hairless. The rhizomes are wide-spreading, fleshy, and bear fibrous roots. The flowers of the watermint are tiny, densely crowded, purple, tubular, pinkish to lilac in colour and form a terminal hemispherical inflorescence; flowering is from mid to late summer. Water mint is visited by many types of insects, and can be characterized by a generalized pollination syndrome, but can also spread by underground rhizomes. All parts of the plant have a distinctly minty smell. Unbranched, hairless plants, with narrower leaves and paler flowers, native to areas of Sweden and Finland near the Baltic Sea, have been called Mentha aquatica var. litoralis.

Mentha aquatica is a polyploid, with 2n = 8x = 96 chromosomes.

Taxonomy
Mentha aquatica was first described by Carl Linnaeus in 1753. The cultivated eau de Cologne mint (also known as bergamot mint) is considered to be a variety of this species.

It hybridises with Mentha spicata (spearmint) to produce Mentha × piperita (peppermint), a sterile hybrid; with Mentha suaveolens (apple mint) to produce Mentha × suavis; with Mentha arvensis (corn mint) to produce Mentha × verticillata; and with both M. arvensis and M. spicata to give the tri-species hybrid Mentha × smithiana.

Distribution and habitat
Water mint is native to much of Europe, northern Africa and western Asia. It has been introduced to North and South America, Australia and some Atlantic islands.

As the name suggests, water mint occurs in the shallow margins and channels of streams, rivers, pools, dikes, ditches, canals, wet meadows, marshes and fens. If the plant grows in the water itself, it rises above the surface of the water. It generally occurs on mildly acidic to calcareous (it is common on soft limestone) mineral or peaty soils. M. aquatica can occur in certain fen-meadow habitats such as the Juncus subnodulosus–Cirsium palustre plant association.  It is a component of Purple moor grass and rush pastures – a type of Biodiversity ActPlan habitat in the UK.

Uses
It can be used to make a herbal tea. The cultivated variety known as eau de Cologne mint or bergamot mint, is used to produce mentha citrata oil, also known as bergamot mint oil, used in perfumery. Not to be confused with Bergamot essential oil.

Image gallery

See also
Peppermint
Spearmint

References

aquatica
Flora of Europe
Flora of Asia
Flora of Africa
Plants described in 1753
Taxa named by Carl Linnaeus